Jeffrey Wells is a Canadian retired ice hockey defenseman who was an All-American for Bowling Green.

Career
Wells began attending Bowling Green State University in 1990 and quickly became a fixture on the defense. After a good first year, Wells led the Falcons' defense in scoring as a sophomore. Unfortunately, the team flagged badly and posted the worst record in program history. Wells was named an alternate captain for his junior season and responded by more than doubling his point total. He finished third on the team in scoring and helped the team recover by winning 11 more games than the year before. He was named team captain for his final year and tied for the team lead in scoring, becoming the first defenseman in program history to achieve that feat. He led the team to its first winning season in 4 years and was named as an All-American for his achievements.

After graduating in 1994, Wells began his professional career. He spent six years playing at the highest level of the minor leagues in North America but wasn't able to earn a callup to the NHL. In 2000 he decided to travel across the Pacific and spent a year with the Seibu Bears. He returned the following year, spending part of the 2002 season with the Toledo Storm and then went into semi-retirement. He played a handful of games over the succeeding 4 years, finishing up with the Fort Worth Brahmas.

Personal
Wells' son Justin followed in his father's footsteps, matriculating to Bowling Green and spending 4 years with the program before transferring to Boston College as a graduate.

Statistics

Regular season and playoffs

Awards and honors

References

External links

1970 births
Living people
AHCA Division I men's ice hockey All-Americans
Canadian ice hockey defencemen
Ice hockey people from Ontario
People from Brockville
Bowling Green Falcons men's ice hockey players
Providence Bruins players
Birmingham Bulls (ECHL) players
Cincinnati Cyclones players
Japan Ice Hockey League players
Toledo Storm players
Cleveland Barons (2001–2006) players
Fort Worth Brahmas players